Richfield Oil Corporation was an American petroleum company based in California from 1905 to 1966. In 1966 it merged with Atlantic Refining Company to form the Atlantic Richfield Company (later renamed ARCO).

History 
The Richfield Oil Corporation was founded in 1905  and opened its first automotive service station in Los Angeles in 1917.  After quick expansion, Richfield Oil Corp fell to the Great Depression and went into receivership in 1931.

Cities Service Company (now known as Citgo) offered one share of stock for every four Richfield's and acquired a majority of the stock.

Consolidated Oil Corporation (in 1943 renamed Sinclair Oil Corp), in 1932, offered to buy Richfield Oil. While this offer was not accepted, Harry Ford Sinclair, president of Consolidated Oil, continued to pursue Richfield Oil and prevented Standard Oil of California (now known as Chevron) from taking over the company.

Consolidated Oil Corp, in 1935, bought Richfield's eastern United States operations. This maneuver removed Standard Oil of California's interest in Richfield Oil. The east coast gas stations would later be rebranded as Sinclair stations.

Richfield Oil Corp emerged from receivership in 1936 after Rio Grande controlled by Consolidated Oil Corp and Cities Service Company agreed to a merger between Richfield Oil and Rio Grande.

During World War II, two Richfield Oil tanks were bombarded by the Imperial Japanese Army on February 23, 1942 in an attack on the Ellwood oil field, which is west of the city of Santa Barbara in California. This attack by the Japanese submarine I-17 was the first attack on continental America during the war.

Richfield Oil sponsored Disneyland's model freeway Autopia from 1955 to 1970.

The company merged with Atlantic Refining to form Atlantic Richfield Corp, later known as ARCO, in 1966.  After spinning off Atlantic Refining to Sonoco, ARCO was purchased by BP plc in 2000.

Landmarks 
The construction of the Richfield Tower in Los Angeles. This 12 story black and gold Art Deco building was completed in 1929. This building served as Richfield's headquarters for many years. It was demolished in 1968.

Opening of the California Carson Oil Refinery in 1938.

The Richfield Oil Corp was the first to discover commercial quantities of oil in the state of Alaska. This occurred in 1957 on the Kenai Peninsula. Richfield's success at Kenai helped push their leasing tracks at Prudhoe Bay, which later served to benefit ARCO.  https://www.amazon.com/photos/shared/CkLZqZKbQuqBALDe3ygUNw.urd5Cci6V14O-AEBKwYagX

Merger with Atlantic Refining Company 
Atlantic Refining Company found itself needing more oil production. It first merged with Hondo Oil & Gas Company in 1962 . Later, with former Hondo president Robert O. Anderson at the helm, Atlantic Refining continued its mergers and acquisitions. On a fishing trip with Richfield Oil Chairman Charles S. Jones, Robert O. Anderson, by then Chairman of Atlantic, arranged a merger to form the Atlantic Richfield Company. The merger that would eventually become ARCO was completed in 1966.

Trademarks 

 RICHCOTE
 ROCOLUBE
 RIO GRANDE
 RIOMIX
 CIRCLE C
 SUPER CIRCLE C

Symbols and colors 

Richfield used both a realistic drawing and a stylized eagle as its symbol. This was often done in blue and yellow since blue and yellow were used as corporate colors.

References

External links 
 Oil Company Histories,
 Atlantic Richfield Company, Funding Universe retrieved 8/4/2011

Defunct oil companies of the United States
Automotive fuel retailers
Petroleum in California
ARCO
Companies based in Los Angeles County, California
Defunct companies based in Greater Los Angeles
Non-renewable resource companies established in 1905
Non-renewable resource companies disestablished in 1966
1905 establishments in California
1966 disestablishments in California